Kavish Seth is an Indian poet, singer, songwriter and an inventor. Kavish has created his own musical instrument called Noori. Noori consists of 14 strings and is shaped like a guitar, but with a wooden frame covered in goatskin to produce percussive sound like  a Djembe.

Personal life 
Kavish graduated from IIT Bombay. He has conceptualized Zubaan, a music project that aims to create platforms for collaboration between independent music artists from different corners of India. Chapters have started in Odisha, Varanasi, Deoria, Kausani, Khetri, Nagpur/ Wardha/ Gadchiroli, Mumbai, Kolkata where around 30 artists have been collaborating and performing all across the mainland.

References 

Hindustani instrumentalists
Indian guitarists
Living people
1992 births
Slide guitarists
20th-century Indian musicians